The 1975 Grand National (officially known as the  News of the World Grand National for sponsorship reasons) was the 129th renewal of the Grand National horse race that took place at Aintree near Liverpool, England, on 5 April 1975. The race was won by 13/2 second-favourite L'Escargot, ridden by Tommy Carberry, in a time of nine minutes and 31.1 seconds and by a distance of 15 lengths over 7/2 favourite Red Rum, who was thus denied a third consecutive win.

Finishing order

Non-finishers

Media coverage and aftermath
David Coleman presented a Grand National Grandstand special. Unfortunately, this year saw two fatalities. Land Lark suffered a heart attack whilst jumping the 15th and Beau Bob who had noticeably tired and dropped back to the rear took a heavy fall at Becher's Brook on the second circuit (22nd fence) and had to be euthanized.

References

Sources

 1975
Grand National
Grand National
20th century in Merseyside
April 1975 sports events in the United Kingdom